Colón Municipality is a municipality in Querétaro in central Mexico.

Recent municipal presidents

See also
Urecho

References

Municipalities of Querétaro